Acacia celsa, commonly known as brown salwood, is a tree belonging to the genus Acacia and the subgenus Juliflorae that is native to north eastern Australia.

Description
It has hard, thin and shallowly bark that is cracked and fissured along with flattened and acutely angled branchlets that are a light greenish colour at the extremities. Like most species of Acacia it has phyllodes rather than true leaves. It flowers between January and May producing yellow flowers.

Distribution
It is endemic to north eastern parts of Queensland from as far north as Cooktown to the eastern area of the Atherton Tableland with a separate disjunct southern population located in the Paluma Range to the north west of Townsville.

See also
List of Acacia species

References

celsa
Flora of Queensland
Plants described in 2000